Sinervo is a Finnish surname. Notable people with the surname include:

Barry Sinervo (1961–2021), behavioral ecologist and evolutionary biologist
Elvi Sinervo (1912–1986), Finnish writer
Helena Sinervo (born 1961), Finnish poet and novelist

Finnish-language surnames